Maïa is a variant of Maia. It may refer to:

Maïa (singer), Canadian singer, earlier part of Canadian band Ladies of the Canyon
Maïa Vidal (born 1988), American composer, songwriter, musician, and visual artist
Maïa (rocket), a small-lift launch vehicle proposed by the government of France in 2021

See also
Maia (disambiguation)